Sebastian Hofmann (born 12 September 1983) is a former professional footballer who played as a forward who plays for GSV Maichingen.

Career 
Hofmann was born in Sinsheim. He made his debut at TSG 1899 Hoffenheim in 2003 in the Regionalliga Süd.

In July 2006, he moved to VfB Stuttgart II on a free transfer. He made his debut at VfB Stuttgart II in a 0–0 draw against TSV 1860 München II in the 2006–07 season and scored his first goal against FC Ingolstadt 04. In the 2006–07 season he played 11 games and scored two goals. In the 2007–08 season, Hofmann played 24 games and scored nine goals. In the 2008–09 season he played 23 games and scored six goals. On 5 June 2009, he extended his contract at VfB until the end of June 2011. As he did not succeed in getting a place in Stuttgart's first team, he joined FC Ingolstadt in June 2010.

References

External links 
 

1983 births
Living people
People from Sinsheim
Sportspeople from Karlsruhe (region)
German footballers
Association football forwards
2. Bundesliga players
3. Liga players
TSG 1899 Hoffenheim II players
TSG 1899 Hoffenheim players
VfB Stuttgart II players
FC Ingolstadt 04 players
SSV Jahn Regensburg players
Footballers from Baden-Württemberg